Léonide Honore Cyr (April 19, 1926 – November 4, 2009) was a Canadian politician. He served in the Legislative Assembly of New Brunswick from 1967 to 1970 as member of the Liberal party.

References

1926 births
2009 deaths
New Brunswick Liberal Association MLAs
People from Edmundston